Erich Reifschneider (born 7 September 1957 in Bad Nauheim) is a former competitive figure skater who represented West Germany. He is the 1971 Nebelhorn Trophy champion and a three-time national champion (1973–75). He competed at five ISU Championships; his best result, 12th, came at the 1973 Europeans in Cologne and 1974 Europeans in Zagreb. He works as a doctor in Florstadt.

Competitive highlights

References

External links 
 

1957 births
German male single skaters
Living people
People from Bad Nauheim
Sportspeople from Darmstadt (region)